San José Obrero is a district of the Cordillera Department, Paraguay.

Populated places in the Cordillera Department